Carlo de Reuver (born 29 January 1995) is a Dutch professional footballer who currently plays as a striker for DCV Krimpen.

External links
 Voetbal International profile 

1995 births
Living people
Dutch footballers
Excelsior Rotterdam players
Helmond Sport players
Eredivisie players
Eerste Divisie players
Footballers from Rotterdam
Association football forwards